Uchchala or Uchchala Deva, (also spelt as Uccala) was a King of Kashmir who ruled for 10 years from 1101 to 1111 AD. He belonged to Utpala dynasty, a Hindu Kingdom of Kashmiri rulers and was the founder of "Second Lohara dynasty". He was the close relative of Harsha and the brother of "Sussala".

Conquests
Uchchala, accompanied with his brother Sussala, entered in they valley through Lahore and they joined the army of reigning royal family at low-ranking commanding positions granted to them. The army was under the control of Harsha. Uchchala pretended to be the brave and loyal towards the king and as a result, He was appointed as the privileged member of the royal court. In 1099 when the kingdom was under draught-crises, the king imposed heavy taxes on people. Uchchala was disappointed by the taxes which were imposed by the king. He, along with his brother left the capital city Srinagar with the fear that they would be treated same. Despite showing the bravery and loyalty, the king had already started to suspect the two of harbouring the high ambitions to gain the throne and regarded them as a direct threat to the kingdom and rivals to his son "Bhoja". After an interval of remaining away from Srinagar, the two brothers then returned with army via Lahore. It was Darmas who supported the two. They attacked the king and burnt the capital city. During this battle,  the king's son "Bhoja" was killed. Uchchala then ascended the throne and was also regarded as the founder of "Second Lohara dynasty". He restored religious building and constructed new temples.

Kalhana, 12th century's historian who is believed to had covered the entire History of Kashmir writes in his book Rajatarangini that "Sussala" ruled Lahore with the support of his brother Uchchala. Despite the fact of extended his support, Sussala was among the other rulers who were ambitious of throne. In order to avoid any untoward action identified to be taken by his brother, Uchchala divided the kingdom into two parts which placed Sussala on the throne in Lahore.

Personal life
Uchchala, the eldest son of his parents was married to "Jayamati" she was a beautiful queen and fond of singing.

Assassination
Uchchala ruled the Kashmir for over ten years and meanwhile during his reign, He was assassinated by his enemy "Radda" at "Banihâl" (now Banihal) in A.D. 1111 and invaded the region for one night only.

References

1111 deaths
Rulers of Kashmir
Assassinated royalty
Dynasties of India